Angela Schanelec (born 14 February 1962) is a German actress, film director and screenwriter. Her film Places in Cities was screened in the Un Certain Regard section at the 1998 Cannes Film Festival. At the 69th Berlin International Film Festival, Schanelec won the Silver Bear for Best Director for her film I Was at Home, But.

Biography
Schanelec was born in Aalen, Baden-Württemberg, in Germany. Her artistic career began as an actress onstage; however, she is best known today for her career as a filmmaker, which began during her time at the Berlin Film and Television Academy (dffb). There, she studied under Harun Farocki and Hartmut Bitomsky, and met Christian Petzold and Thomas Arslan, with whom she comprised the so-called first wave of the Berlin School. During this time, she produced her thesis film, I Stayed in Berlin All Summer, a 47-minute featurette. Schanelec, Petzold and Arslan found support in the budding artistic scene of post-reunification Berlin, and in the production company Schramm Film, operated by Michael Weber and Florian Koerner von Gustorf. Since graduating from dffb, She has written and directed 7 features and contributed segments to the anthology films Bridges of Sarajevo and Germany 09.

Critical reception
Schanelec's films have premiered at numerous renowned film festivals, including the Cannes Film Festival, the Berlin International Film Festival, and the Toronto International Film Festival. Critics have generally embraced her cinematic style, which almost exclusively employs lengthy, static shots with little action and ambiguous emotional content, tenuously connected by a narrative. Marco Abel, a scholar of the Berlin School, argues that her films function through "affective images" which reach the viewer primarily through their visual content, mostly without requiring narrative context. She is frequently compared to several European avant-garde filmmakers, such as Chantal Akerman, Michelangelo Antonioni, and Robert Bresson, whom she has cited as an important influence. However, Derek Elley, writing for Variety, called Places in Cities a "joyless snoozer" and remarked that Schanelec's films "throw out no emotional lifelines for the viewer."

Selected filmography

 The Death of the White Stallion (1985), as Anna
 I Stayed in Berlin All Summer (1994)
 My Sister's Good Fortune (1995)
 Places in Cities (1998)
  (2001)
 Marseille (2004)
  (2007)
 Germany 09: 13 Short Films About The State Of The Nation (2009)
 Orly (2010)
 Bridges of Sarajevo (2014)
 The Dreamed Path (2016)
 I Was at Home, But (2019)
 Music (2023)

References

External links

1962 births
Living people
20th-century German actresses
21st-century German actresses
German film actresses
People from Aalen
Film people from Baden-Württemberg
Silver Bear for Best Director recipients
Silver Bear for Best Screenplay winners